The Beloit Riverfest was an annual music festival held in July at Riverside Park in Beloit, Wisconsin.  The festival attracted thousands of people from the American Midwest, who came to see internationally known musicians perform. In addition to music, the festival had a carnival, shops, and food vendors.  Riverfest was held the second week of July and ran from Thursday through Sunday.

The Riverfest Board of Directors voted to discontinue the festival in 2013 because of reduced financial support and difficulty in recruiting new board members.

Location

Riverfest was held on Riverside Drive, north of downtown for most of its existence. The festival typically spanned from Riverside Park to the Beloit Mall (now Eclipse Center). Concerts were typically held closer to the park whereas the carnival stretched throughout the street. In its final years, Riverfest relocated out to the space where ABC Supply Stadium is located.

Past performers
Groups that have performed at Riverfest include:
 12 Stones
 The Beach Boys
 Blue Öyster Cult
 Johnny Cash
 Ray Charles
 Cheap Trick
 Collective Soul
 Alice Cooper
 Crossfade
 Earth, Wind, and Fire
 Hootie and the Blowfish
 K.C. and the Sunshine Band
 B.B. King
 Foghat
 Kool and the Gang
 Little Richard
 Lynyrd Skynyrd
 The Outlaws
 Ted Nugent
 REO Speedwagon
 Quiet Riot
 Saliva
 Evan's Blue
 Halestorm
 Shinedown
 Silvertide
 Smash Mouth
 Rick Springfield
 Styx
 Survivor
 Tesla
 Trapt
 "Weird Al" Yankovic

References

External links
Official Beloit Riverfest website

Festivals in Wisconsin
Beloit, Wisconsin
Tourist attractions in Rock County, Wisconsin